DHF may refer to: 

 Al Dhafra Air Base (IATA code DHF)
 Danish Handball Federation (Dansk Håndbold Forbund), the national governing body for handball in Denmark
 Design history file, documentation of the design history of a medical device, kept per FDA regulations
 Dihydrofolic acid, a folic acid derivative that occurs in some metabolic pathways
 Diastolic heart failure, heart failure during diastole
 Decompensated heart failure, that is, acute decompensated heart failure, a sudden worsening of heart failure
 Dengue hemorrhagic fever, the severe form of dengue fever with hemorrhage and high mortality risk